Eugene is a common male given name that comes from the Greek εὐγενής (eugenēs), "noble", literally "well-born", from εὖ (eu), "well" and γένος (genos), "race, stock, kin". Gene is a common shortened form. The feminine variant is Eugenia or Eugenie.

Egon, a common given name in parts of central and northern Europe, is also a variant of Eugene / Eugine. Other male foreign-language variants include:

People 
Notable people with the given name Eugene or Eugène include:

Christianity 

Pope Eugene I (died 657), Italian pope from 655 to 657
Pope Eugene II (died 827), Italian pope from 824 to 827
Pope Eugene III (died 1153), Italian pope from 1145 to 1153
Pope Eugene IV (1383–1447), Italian pope from 1431 to 1447
Eugene or Eugenios of Trebizond, 4th century Christian saint and martyr
St. Eugene, one of the deacons of saint Zenobius of Florence
Eugene (Eoghan) (died c. 618), Irish saint
Eugène Philippe LaRocque (1927–2018), Roman Catholic bishop from Canada
Eugene Antonio Marino (1934–2000), first African-American archbishop in the United States

Military 

Prince Eugene of Savoy (1663–1736), Austrian general, statesman of the Holy Roman Empire and the Austrian monarchy
Eugène de Beauharnais (1781–1824), stepson and adopted child of Napoleon
Eugene A. Greene (1921–1942), American sailor, posthumous recipient of the Navy Cross
Eugène Maizan (1819–1845), French naval lieutenant and explorer
Eugene Sledge (1923–2001), American World War II Marine and academic
Eugene Sullivan, (1918-1942), American sailor, one of the Sullivan brothers.

Television and films 

Gene L. Coon (1924–1973), American screenwriter and television producer
Eugene Cordero, American actor
Eugene Robert Glazer (born 1942), American actor
Gene Hackman (born 1930), American actor
Gene Kelly (1912–1996), American dancer, actor, singer, director, producer, and choreographer
Eugene Levy (born 1946), Canadian actor
Eugene Mirman (born 1974), Russian-born American comedian, writer, and filmmaker
Gene Rayburn (1917-1999), American radio personality and game show host
Gene Roddenberry (1921–1991), American scriptwriter and producer
Eugène Saccomano (born 1936), French radio journalist and non-fiction author
Gene Siskel (1946–1999), American film critic

Music 
Gene Allison (1934–2004), American R&B singer
Gene Austin (1900–1972), American singer-songwriter
Gene Clark (1944–1991), American singer, songwriter, founding member of the band The Byrds
Eugen Doga (born 1937), Moldovan composer
Eugene Aynsley Goossens (1893–1962), English conductor and composer
Eugène Goossens, fils (1867–1958), French conductor and violinist
Eugène Goossens, père (1845–1906), Belgian conductor
Eugene Hütz (born 1972), Ukrainian-American singer, composer, disc jockey and actor, frontman of the band Gogol Bordello
Eugene Izotov (born 1973), Russian-American oboist
Gene Krupa (1909–1973), American jazz and big band drummer
Gene McDaniels (1935–2011), American singer-songwriter
Eugene Ormandy (1899–1985), Hungarian-born conductor
Eugene Pao, Hong Kong jazz guitarist
Eugene Tzigane, Japanese-American conductor
Eugene Wright (1923–2020), American jazz bassist, member of the Dave Brubeck Quartet
Eugène Ysaÿe (1858–1931), Belgian violinist, composer and conductor

Literature 

Eugene Field (1850–1895), American writer, columnist and children's poet
Eugène Ionesco, Romanian-French playwright and dramatist
Eugène Marin Labiche, French dramatist
Eugène Lanti, French Esperantist, socialist and writer
Eugene Marais, South African writer and poet
Eugene O'Neill, American playwright
Eugène Edine Pottier, French revolutionary socialist, poet, and transport worker
Eugene Trivizas, Greek author

Art 
Eugène Broerman, Belgian painter
Eugène Boudin, French painter
Eugène Carrière, French symbolist
Eugène Delacroix, French painter
Eugène Grasset, Swiss decorative artist of the Belle Epoque
Eugene Lambert, Irish puppeteer
Eugene Pandala, Indian architect
Evgenios Spatharis, Greek shadow theatre artist
Eugene V. Thaw (1927–2018), American art dealer and collector

Politics 

Eugene V. Debs, American socialist
Eugene Reginald de Fonseka (died 2003), puisne judge of the Supreme Court of Sri Lanka
Eugene J. McCarthy, U.S. senator from Minnesota
Eugene McGehee, Louisiana politician
Eugene Mitchell, American lawyer and president of the Atlanta Board of Education
Eugène Paquet, Canadian parliamentarian
Eugène Ruffy, Swiss politician
Eugene Sawyer, American businessman and politician
Eugene Terre'Blanche (1941–2010), South African right-wing politician and leader of the AWB

Sports 
Eugene Laverty, Irish professional motorcyclist
Eugene Galekovic, Australian goalkeeper
Eugene Sseppuya, Ugandan football striker
Eugène Chaboud, Formula One driver from France
Eugène Christophe, French professional cyclist
Eugene Lawrence (born 1986), American professional basketball player
Eugene Selznick (born 1930), American volleyball player
Eugene Glazer (fencer), American Olympic fencer
Gene Cockrell (born 1934), American football player
Gene Filipski (1931–1994), American football player
Gene Moore (outfielder), right fielder in Major League Baseball
Gene Moore (pitcher), left-handed pitcher in Major League Baseball
Gene Okerlund, American professional wrestling announcer
Gene Prebola, American football player
Geno Smith, American football player
Gene Snitsky, American professional wrestler who formerly performed for World Wrestling Entertainment
Gene Upshaw, American football player, labor leader, and former NFL Players Association director

Sciences 

Eugène Michel Antoniadi, Greek astronomer
Eugen Bleuler, Swiss psychiatrist who coined the terms schizophrenia and autism
Eugène Charles Catalan, Belgian mathematician
Eugene Cernan (1934–2017), American astronaut, eleventh person to walk on the Moon
Eugene Chelyshev (1921–2020), Russian indologist
Eugene Goodilin, Russian material scientist 
Eugène Joseph Delporte, Belgian astronomer
Eugene Gu, American physician-scientist
Eugene Guth, Hungarian-American theoretical physicist
Eugene Lazowski, Polish doctor who saved 8,000 people by creating a fake typhus epidemic in World War II
Eugene Parker (1927-2022), American solar and plasma physicist, after which the Parker Solar Probe was named
Eugene Merle Shoemaker, American astronomer and geologist
Eugène Simon, French arachnologist
Eugène Soubeiran, French scientist who served as chief pharmacist at the Pitié-Salpêtrière Hospital
Eugene Stanley, American physicist
Eugene Paul Wigner, Hungarian-American theoretical physicist and winner of Nobel Prize in Physics in 1963

Other professions 
Eugene Allen, White House butler
Eugene Burger, American magician and author
Gene Gotti, Italian-American mobster
Eugene Jarvis, American computer games designer and programmer
Eugene de Kock (born 1949), South African policeman serving a life sentence
Gene Kranz, NASA Flight Director
Eugène Minkowski, French psychiatrist
Gene Moore (window dresser), American designer and window dresser
Eugene Murtagh, Irish billionaire businessman, founder of Kingspan Group
Eugene Skinner, American pioneer, founder of Eugene, Oregon
Eugene Stoner (1922–1997), American firearms designer, who designed M16 rifle
Eugene Thuraisingam, Singaporean criminal lawyer
Eugène Viollet-le-Duc, French architect
Eugene Wigner, Hungarian physicist

Fictional characters 
Gene Belcher, a main character in the animated series Bob's Burgers
Eugene Chaud, in Mega Man Battle Network
Eugene Fitzherbert, the male protagonist in Tangled, commonly called 'Flynn Rider'
Eugene "Bling-Bling Boy" Hamilton, antagonist in the animated series Johnny Test
Eugene Horowitz, in Hey Arnold! media
Gene Hunt, in Life on Mars and Ashes to Ashes
Eugene H. Krabs or Mr. Krabs, in SpongeBob SquarePants media
Eugene Meltsner, in the Adventures in Odyssey series
The title character in Eugene Onegin, a novel in verse by Alexander Pushkin also made into an opera by Pyotr Ilyich Tchaikovsky
Eugene (Pokémon) or Eusine, in Pokémon media
Eugene Tackleberry, in Police Academy
Eugene "Flash" Thompson, in the Spider-Man comics
Eugene "Skull" Skullovitch, comic relief in Power Rangers
Eugene Wrayburn, one of the main characters in Charles Dickens' novel Our Mutual Friend
Eugene Young, in The Practice
Gene Evernight, also known as Kyrios, antagonist in ArcheAge
Eugene Dix, in Final Destination 2
Eugene Francis, in The Boss Baby
Eugene Choi, a main character in the Korean drama Mr. Sunshine
Gene, a former antagonist on Regular Show

See also 
Eugene (disambiguation)
Eugen
Eugenio
Eugenios
Eugenius, Western Roman emperor
Eugenia (name)
Kevin, a name of Irish origin with a similar meaning

References 

Given names of Greek language origin
English masculine given names